James "Jim" M. Loree was the president and chief executive officer of Stanley Black & Decker (SWK), a position he has held since August 1, 2016 to July 2022. Stanley Black & Decker is a Fortune 500 company with $11 billion revenues and $28 billion market cap.

Education
Jim attended Union College in Schenectady, New York. He graduated in 1980 with a B.A. in Economics. He is a member of a secret society known as the Sigma Phi Society. He is also a member of the honor and scholarship greek letter organizations Phi Beta Kappa and Omicron Delta Epsilon.

Career
Jim Loree first joined Stanley Black & Decker (then Stanley Works) in 1999, serving as VP and chief financial officer with 19 years previously with General Electric Company (GE). Eventually being named EVP and CFO in 2002, EVP & chief operating officer in 2009 and President & COO in 2013 before then as President & COO (2013–2016).

Beginning in 2002, Loree began an M&A effort to transform Stanley into a growth-oriented diversified industrial company. Since then company revenues have more than quadrupled, fueled by over seventy acquisitions including the landmark merger with Black & Decker in 2010.

Board memberships
Jim served for over five years as a director of Harsco Corporation, including four as Audit Committee Chair. He also serves as a member of the National Association of Manufacturers, on the Wall Street Journal CEO Council, as a Business Roundtable member, a Trustee of Union College, a director of Hartford Hospital and a director of the Jim and Rebecca Loree Foundation.

Family
Loree is married to Rebecca Corbin Loree, Founder & CEO of Corbin Advisors, LLC. Jim relocated to the greater Hartford, Connecticut area in 1999.

References

External links 
 www.stanleyblackanddecker.com
 http://loreefoundation.org

Living people
American chief executives of manufacturing companies
Union College (New York) alumni
People from Hartford County, Connecticut
General Electric employees
Year of birth missing (living people)